Balls Deep may refer to:
 Balls Deep (album), an album by Scissorfight
 Balls Deep (TV series), a documentary series airing on Viceland